Trimethoprim/sulfadiazine (TMP/SDZ) is a combination drug composed of trimethoprim and sulfadiazine used in the treatment of bacterial infections of animals, particularly horses.

References

Combination antibiotics
Veterinary drugs